Solbon Dondupovich Angabaev (1931-2001) was a Soviet poet of Buryat origin. He was born in Kurumkansky district, Buryatia in 1931. 

He graduated with a silver medal from the Republican secondary school No. 18, and then attended the Gorky Literary Institute. His poetic debut occurred at the age of 14, in the regional newspaper Kurumkansky Kolkhoznik. He went on to publish several poems in Buryad-Mongoloy Onen in 1949. He took part in the 1949 conference of young writers of Buryatia.

Angabaev's first poetry collection “Herd Steppe” was published in 1956 by the publishing house “Molodaya Gvardiya”, with Russian translation by V. Zhuravlev. His second volume “Baigalai Taabari” (The Mystery of Baikal) appeared in 1958 in Ulan-Ude. He published many poetry collections: 

 "Igaabari" (Thaw) (1964)
 "Hүsen" (Energy) (1968)
 "Oryol өөde" (To the top) (1971)
 "Bodol" (Dumas) (1975)
 "Agar zandan "(Sandalwood) (1979)
 "Onder naran" (High Sun) (1981)
 "Nyudenei sesegi" (The apple of an eye) (1983)
 "Barkhan uula "(1991)

Several collections were translated by V. Zhuravlev, S. Kuznetsova and others, and were published in Ulan-Ude and Moscow. 

Angabaev also wrote prose, among them stories such as "Ain daa, nүhedni!" (Thanks comrades!) (1961), "Naked Ariede" (On the river bank) (1966), etc, and non-fiction works and memoirs such as "The Word of the Masters" (1981), "Bata nүhed, bagshanarni" (Living Water) (1985), "The Legend of the Sable Land" (2000), "My Friends - my immortality" (2001), etc.

He died in November 2001.

References

Soviet writers
Buryat writers
Maxim Gorky Literature Institute alumni